Saint-Vaast-Dieppedalle is a commune in the Seine-Maritime department in the Normandy region in northern France.

Geography

Population

Places of interest
 The sixteenth century church of St.Vaast.
 The stone cross, dating from the sixteenth century.

See also
Communes of the Seine-Maritime department

References

Communes of Seine-Maritime